Halodule pinifolia is a seagrass species in the genus Halodule. It is found in shallow sea waters.

Distribution and habitat
This is a common seagrass in Asian tropical coasts. Halodule pinifolia forms homogenous patches in intertidal places or occasionally intermixed with other seagrasses (Skelton and South 2006). Halodule pinifolia grows in sandy or muddy sand substrates from upper littoral to subtidal areas. It is ephemeral with rapid turn-over and high seed set, and is well adapted to high levels of disturbance. This species is can grow rapidly and is a fast coloniser. Often heavily epiphytised. [2]

Description
 Fine, delicate leaves up to 20 cm long
 1 central vein
 Black central vein splits into two at the rounded leaf tip
 Usually pale rhizome, with clean black leaf scars
 Found on inter tidal sand banks

Ecology
This species is known to be hybridized to Halodule uninervis in Okinawa, Japan.

References

External links
 
 http://www.seagrasswatch.org/id_seagrass.html

Cymodoceaceae